Max Kaur (born on 9 December 1969 in Tallinn) is an Estonian politician. He is a member of the Centre Party. He was mayor of Mustvee 2013–2017. Since 2018 he is a Jõhvi municipality vice-governor. Since 2019 he is a Mayor of Jõhvi. 

Max Kaur studied law at Moscow International Independent University of Environmental and Political Sciences (IIUEPS), LL.B., and economics at Saint Petersburg State University of Engineering and Economics, MS in Economics. He earned his PhD in 2013 from Saint Petersburg State University of Economics.

Max Kaur was counsellor of the Mayor of Tallinn, Edgar Savisaar from 2002 to 2005. He was vice-mayor of Maardu from 2005 to 2006. Max Kaur was first elected to Tallinn City Council in the Estonian local elections 2009. He was elected Mayor of Mustvee in April 2013. He was re-elected in December 2013.

He was a founder and leader of the Estonian social movement against gambling. He is an author of the idea to create a unique sculpture in Tallinn against addiction.

References

1969 births
Living people
Estonian Centre Party politicians
Mayors of places in Estonia
Politicians from Tallinn
Saint-Petersburg State University of Architecture and Civil Engineering alumni
20th-century Estonian politicians